William J. Brown may refer to:

 William J. Brown (architect) (died 1970), American architect
 William J. Brown (boxing) (1874–1943), American boxing commissioner, referee, and promoter.
 William J. Brown (Indiana politician) (1805–1857), member of the Indiana House of Representatives
 William J. Brown (Ohio politician) (1940–1999), Ohio Attorney General
 William Jethro Brown (1868–1930), Australian jurist and professor of law

See also
 William Brown (disambiguation)
 William Joseph Browne (1897–1989), Canadian politician in the Newfoundland House of Assembly and the Canadian House of Commons